Herbert Kolly (born 28 February 1969) is a Swiss freestyle skier. He competed in the men's aerials event at the 1994 Winter Olympics.

References

External links
 

1969 births
Living people
Swiss male freestyle skiers
Olympic freestyle skiers of Switzerland
Freestyle skiers at the 1994 Winter Olympics
Sportspeople from the canton of Fribourg
20th-century Swiss people